Rio Grande Valley Grandes was an American soccer team based in Edinburg, Texas, United States. Founded in 2010, the team played in the USL Premier Development League (PDL), the fourth tier of the American Soccer Pyramid, in the Mid South Division of the Southern Conference. The team played its home games at Edinburg Field in nearby Edinburg, Texas. The team's colors were white, blue and gold. The team folded after its first season in 2011.

History
The Grandes were awarded a PDL franchise on January 18, 2011 following the demise of their predecessor, the Rio Grande Valley Bravos, which had their franchise terminated by the USL Premier Development League in October 2010 when the club’s interim owner was unable to complete his financial obligations to the league. The team was officially announced as a USL Premier Development League expansion franchise on February 18, 2011.

The team played its first competitive game on May 6, 2011, a 5-1 loss to Laredo Heat. The first goal in franchise history was scored by Alfonso Cavazos.

Players

Roster
As of June 4, 2011.

Year-by-year

Head coaches
  Gary Hamilton (2011)

Stadia
 Edinburg Field; Edinburg, Texas (2011–present)

Average attendance
Attendance stats are calculated by averaging each team's self-reported home attendances from the historical match archive at https://web.archive.org/web/20131208011525/http://www.uslsoccer.com/history/index_E.html.

 2011: to be announced

References

External links
 Official site
 Official PDL site

Soccer clubs in Texas
Edinburg, Texas
Sports in the Rio Grande Valley
2010 establishments in Texas
2011 disestablishments in Texas
Association football clubs established in 2010
Association football clubs disestablished in 2011
USL League Two teams